The 2021 Liga 3 was the 5th season under its current title and the 33rd season of third tier football in Georgia. The season began on 2 April and ended on 2 December.

Team changes
The following teams have changed division since the previous season:

To Liga 3

Promoted from Liga 4

Varketili Tbilisi • Merani-2 Tbilisi • Didube Tbilisi • Magaroeli Chiatura

From Liga 3

Promoted to Erovnuli Liga 2

Gareji Sagarejo

Teams and league table

This year fourteen clubs took part in a two-round league competition. Their list along with head coaches is shown below. Throughout the year only four teams did not sustain any changes among coaching staff.

League table

Results

Regular season

Promotion play-offs 
First leg 

Second leg

Tbilisi City lost 3-5 on aggregate

Kolkheti-1913 lost on the away goals rule

References

External links
Georgian Football Federation

Liga 3 (Georgia) seasons
3
Georgia
Georgia